is a Japanese football player most recently playing for PEPO in the Finnish third tier Kakkonen.

Club career
He made his professional debut in the Eerste Divisie for SC Telstar on 9 September 2016 in a game against De Graafschap.

He signed a contract until end of the season with Finnish third-tier club IF Gnistan in July 2018.

References

External links
 

1991 births
Living people
Japanese footballers
Japanese expatriate footballers
Azul Claro Numazu players
SC Telstar players
IF Gnistan players
Eerste Divisie players
Kakkonen players
Association football midfielders
Association football people from Tokyo Metropolis
People from Nishitōkyō, Tokyo
Japanese expatriate sportspeople in the Netherlands
Japanese expatriate sportspeople in Finland
Expatriate footballers in the Netherlands
Expatriate footballers in Finland
PEPO Lappeenranta players